Sang Nila Utama was a prince from Palembang and is the founder of the Kingdom of Singapura in 1299. His official title adopted upon his coronation was Sri Tri Buana, which can be translated as "Lord of Three Worlds"; the "Three Worlds" may refer to the three realms of the universe—the heaven of the gods, the world of humans, and the underworld of demons or his lordship over Java, Sumatra and Temasek/Singapura. This title is attested to elsewhere in Southeast Asia.

Sang Nila Utama died in 1347 and his son, Sri Wikrama Wira succeeded him.  The account of his life and those of his successors is given in the Malay Annals; the historicity of the events as recorded there is debated by scholars, and some contend that Sang Nila Utama may be a mythical figure, even if the historicity of Singapore's 14th-century settlement is no longer disputed. Even so, as De Jong argued in his article The Character of Malay Annals,  the stories of the Malay Annals could have been realistically mixed with the historical figures and events.

Biography

Sang Nila Utama was a Prince of Palembang, born to King Sang Sapurba, supposed descendant of Alexander the Great and a Bactrian princess, through his interpretation in Islamic legend as Iskandar Zulkairnan and the pseudo-mythical ancestor to many monarchs and chiefs of the Malay world. He was wed to Wan Sri Bini, daughter of the widowed Queen Parameswari Iskandar Shah of Bintan Island and received high honours comprising a golden crown studded with precious stones and a royal signet ring indicating his authority.

According to the Malay Annals, the emporium of Singapore was founded in 1299 by Sang Nila Utama. While hunting on Bintan, he spotted a stag and started chasing it up a small hill but, when he reached the top, the stag vanished. He then came to a very large rock and decided to climb it. When he stood on top of the rock, he looked across the sea and saw another island with a white sandy beach which had the appearance of a white sheet of cloth. Asking his chief minister what island it was, he was told that it was the island of Temasek now known as Singapore . While his ship was out at sea, a great storm erupted and the ship was tossed about in the huge waves and began to take in water.  To prevent it from sinking, his men threw all the heavy things on board into the sea to lighten the ship. But still water kept entering the ship. On the advice of the ship's captain, he threw his crown overboard as a gift to the sea. At once, the storm died down and he reached Temasek safely.

He landed safely on the beach, and went to hunt wild animals near the river mouth on a patch of open ground, now referred to as the Padang. Suddenly, he saw a strange animal with a red body, black head and a white breast, which swiftly disappeared into the jungle. Impressed by this beast's beauty, he asked his chief minister Demang Lebar Daun what animal it was and was informed that it was a lion. Pleased with this as he believed it to be a good omen, he decided to build his new city in Temasek. He and his men stayed on the island and founded a city, renaming the island to Singapura, which in Sanskrit means "Lion City".

Sang Nila Utama fathered two sons with Wan Sri Bini, born Raja Kechil-Besar and Raja Kechil-Muda the elder son was married to Nila Panchadi, a princess from India and the younger was married to his cousin, a granddaughter of Demang Lebar Dawn. After ruling Singapura for 48 years, Sang Nila Utama died in 1347 and Raja Kechil-Besar ascended to the throne as Sri Wikrama Wira, becoming the second Raja of Singapura; Kechil-Muda was appointed his prime minister and Bendahara of its port. Sang Nila Utama was buried on Bukit Larangan, now known as Fort Canning Hill; the exact location of his grave is unknown, although the altar at Keramat Iskandar Shah may share a site with the royal burials atop the hill.

The events in the tale of Sang Nila Utama are highly symbolic and are unlikely to be sober retellings of historical events. The casting of the crown into the sea, an action imbued with symbolic meaning as "sovereignty" in the Malay world relied strongly on ceremony and attire, could represent the shift of power from Palembang to Singapura as the new centre of power for the Malay kings.

It has been pointed out that lions have never lived in Singapore (not even Asiatic lions), and the beast seen by Sang Nila Utama was therefore suggested to be a tiger, most likely to be the Malayan tiger. Another candidate for the beast mentioned in the Malay Annals is mythical beast called janggi told in Minangkabau legends as a guardian of gold mines. Dark red hair called rambut janggi, said to be of this mythical beast but probably actually from orangutans, adorn lances that were kept by the Minangkabaus as heirlooms. Regardless of the exact species of animal, the symbolism of the Asiatic lion as an emblem of power was strongly established through the spread of Buddhist culture in Southeast Asia.

There are however a number of other theories about the origin of the name Singapura, with the earliest attestation of any variant of the name being the Ramayana. It has been suggested that the "lion" refers to the lion throne originally set up by Parameswara in Palembang as a challenge to the Majapahit Empire, while others believed that the "lion" refers to a Majapahit Buddhist sect. With regards to the historicity of settlement on Singapore itself, a 3rd-century Chinese account describes it as the "island at the end of a peninsula" or Pulau Ujong, with its settlement later known as Temasek; other settlements such as Long Ya Men and Banzu, along with their governance by local rulers, are recorded by the Yuan Dynasty Chinese traveller Wang Dayuan in his Daoyi Zhilue and later Ming Dynasty records.

Identification with Parameswara 

Although the archaeology of Singapore has lain rest to the idea that its 14th-century history is wholly fictional, it has been suggested that the figure of Sang Nila Utama himself, with his illustrious genealogy and fantastic deeds, was a literary device intended to cover up the ignominious history of the founder of Melaka, the Sultan Parameswara. As related in the Suma Oriental of Tome Pires, there are striking similarities between the biographies of both individuals, namely their birth in Palembang, and founding (or usurpation) of Singapore.  Confusing matters further is that "Parameswara", deriving from the Sanskrit for "Supreme Lord", was a highly popular title amongst contemporary rulers both in mainland and archipelagic Southeast Asia.

Parameswara's rule, unlike Sang Nila Utama's, involves deceit and treachery, namely assassinating its local ruler after enjoying his hospitality for nine days, and unlike Sri Tri Buana's illustrious settlement is terminated almost immediately by the Siamese superiors of this murdered chieftain. The conquest of Singapore forces him to flee to the Malay Peninsula, eventually leading to the establishment of the Melaka Sultanate; the destruction of Singapore is instead blamed on a king known as Iskandar Shah, the fifth Raja of Singapura and fourth successor to Sang Nila Utama, and the island's conquerors are identified as Javanese of Majapahit.

These differences may reflect ideological differences in their sources; Pires named a "Javanese chronicle" as his source for Parameswara's biography, and is therefore more likely to have transmitted biases among the Majapahit against their Sumatran predecessors in Srivijaya, whereas the Malay Annals seek to highlight historical connections between the Kingdom of Singapura and its successor states of the Melaka Sultanate and the Johor Sultanate, promoting the legitimacy of its contemporary publishers in Johore. It is therefore unclear as to whether Singapore's 14th-15th century archaeology thus reflects five generations' worth of trade and exchange begun by Sang Nila Utama, or the Majapahit world-order and its brief disruption by Parameswara.

Further reading
 Discussion of the contribution of the Sang Nila Utama story to the mythology of Singapore, in the context of nation branding in Koh, Buck Song (2011). Brand Singapore: How Nation Branding Built Asia's Leading Global City. Marshall Cavendish, Singapore. .

References

S
14th-century monarchs in Asia
Hindu monarchs
Malaysian Hindus
History of Malaysia
History of Singapore
Srivijaya
Founding monarchs
1347 deaths
13th-century Indonesian people
14th-century Indonesian people